We Are Him is the fifth and final studio album by American experimental rock band Angels of Light. It was released on September 11, 2007, via Young God Records. The album features extensive contributions from various musicians, including the members of Akron/Family, Hungarian violinist Eszter Bálint, classical music composer Paul Cantelon, cellist Julia Kent, Bill Rieflin, and singer-songwriter Larkin Grimm.

Critical reception
Upon its release, We Are Him received generally positive reviews from music critics. At Metacritic, which assigns a normalized rating out of 100 to reviews from critics, the album received an average score of 77, which indicates "generally favorable reviews", based on 13 reviews. Richie Unterberger of Allmusic wrote: "Angels of Light come up with a thoroughly respectable and diversely arranged vehicles for his vision on We Are Him, traipsing through an array of interesting moods without diluting the leader's offbeat visions," He also described the album as "much more tuneful and subdued an affair than many would expect from the former band behind Swans," while distancing it from "an average alternative rock record."  Grayson Currin of Pitchfork stated: "Gira, at 53, continues to evolve, to challenge himself." Jason Heller of The A.V. Club concluded: "As much as he's painted as a dour American Nick Cave, Gira's range of tone and emotion is given open pasture here, and We Are Him is one of his strongest, most horrifically hypnotic works yet."

Rob O'Connor of Spin wrote: "Michael Gira still explores the drones and grinding rhythms that he recorded with legendary art-punk band Swans, but on this album with collective Angels of Light, the singer/songwriter focuses on whiplash juxtapositions of sound and style," while also adding that "he cuts and pastes his skewed vision of a Nick Cave-flavored Americana where mandolin and hammer dulcimer rumble with a devilish mariachi band down a dark backstreet." Mike Schiller of PopMatters stated: "Despite all of the shock and the awe, once We Are Him does settle into repeated listening, it never quite reaches the consistent, memorable heights of ...Other People." Andrew Gaerig of Stylus described the record as "an album once again stuffed with villainous, masochistic glee."

Track listing

Personnel
The album personnel, as adapted from Allmusic:

Angels of Light
Michael Gira – production, composing

Akron/Family
Dana Janssen – drums, percussion, vocals
Seth Olinsky – acoustic guitar, electric guitar, piano, vocals
Miles Seaton – bass, electric guitar, piano, vocals
Ryan Vanderhoof – vocals

Other contributors
Eszter Bálint – violin, vocals
Birgit Cassis Staudt – accordion
Paul Cantelon – violin
Patrick Fondiller – mandolin
David Garland – flute, vocals
Larkin Grimm – vocals
Christoph Hahn – electric guitar, foot percussion
Julia Kent – cello
Steve Moses – trombone
Phil Puleo – hammer dulcimer
Bill Rieflin – bass, drums, electric guitar, organ, percussion, piano, synthesizer, vocals
Siobhan Duffy Gira – vocals

Other personnel
Bryce Goggin – engineering, mixing
Doug Henderson – mastering
Ben Kirkendoll – design, layout design
Adam Sachs – assistant, engineering, performance
Deryk Thomas – artwork

References

External links
 "We Are Him" on Young God Records

2007 albums
Angels of Light albums
Young God Records albums
Albums produced by Michael Gira